Englerophytum is a group of trees in the family Sapotaceae described as a genus in 1914.

Englerophytum consists primarily of trees. Their leaves are leathery with dense appressed hairs on the undersides. The genus is widespread across tropical and southern Africa. It is found in the countries of Angola, Benin, Botswana, Burundi, Cameroon, Central African Republic, Republic of Congo, Democratic Republic of the Congo (DRC), Equatorial Guinea, Eswatini, Gabon, Ghana, Guinea, Ivory Coast, Kenya, Liberia, Malawi, Mozambique, Nigeria, Rwanda, Sierra Leone, South Africa ( KwaZulu-Natal, Cape Province and Northern Provinces) Tanzania, Togo, Uganda, Zambia and Zimbabwe.

The genus name of Englerophytum is in honour of Adolf Engler (1844–1930), a German botanist, and also; phytum, a Greek word meaning "plant".

Species
The genus contains the following species:

 Englerophytum congolense (De Wild.) Aubrév. & Pellegr. — Gabon, DRC
 Englerophytum ferrugineum L.Gaut. & O.Lachenaud — Gabon
 Englerophytum gigantifolium O.Lachenaud & L.Gaut. — Gabon
 Englerophytum iturense (Engl.) L.Gaut. — Gabon, DRC
 Englerophytum koulamoutouense (Aubrév. & Pellegr.) ined. — Gabon, Republic of Congo
 Englerophytum laurentii (De Wild.) ined. — from Cameroon to Angola
 Englerophytum le-testui (Aubrév. & Pellegr.) ined. — Gabon, Republic of Congo
 Englerophytum libenii O.Lachenaud & L.Gaut. — Cameroon, Gabon
 Englerophytum longipedicellatum (De Wild.) ined. — Gabon, DRC
 Englerophytum magalismontanum (Sond.) T.D.Penn. — Tanzania, Angola, Malawi, Mozambique, Zambia, Zimbabwe, Botswana, KwaZulu-Natal, Limpopo, Mpumalanga, Eswatini
 Englerophytum mayumbense (Greves) ined. — Gabon, Republic of Congo, Angola (Cabinda)
 Englerophytum natalense (Sond.) T.D.Penn. — Kenya, Uganda, Tanzania, Malawi, Mozambique, Zimbabwe, KwaZulu-Natal, Limpopo, Mpumalanga, Eswatini, Cape Province
 Englerophytum oblanceolatum (S.Moore) T.D.Penn. — W + C Africa from Liberia to Kenya
 Englerophytum oubanguiense (Aubrév. & Pellegr.) Aubrév. & Pellegr. — W + C Africa 
 Englerophytum paludosum L.Gaut., Burgt & O.Lachenaud — Cameroon to Republic of Congo
 Englerophytum rwandense (Troupin) ined. — Rwanda, Burundi
 Englerophytum somiferanum Aubrév. — Gabon
 Englerophytum stelechantha K.Krause — Cameroon, Gabon, Republic of Congo
 Englerophytum sylverianum Kenfack & L.Gaut. — Cameroon to Equatorial Guinea

Gallery

References

 
Sapotaceae genera
Plants described in 1914
Flora of Peru